In the Days of the Thundering Herd is a 1914 silent film western directed jointly by Colin Campbell and Francis J. Grandon. It was produced by the Selig Polyscope Company and distributed by General Film Company. This film stars Tom Mix and is representative of some of his rare surviving early features.

Cast

Preservation status
 Prints have been preserved by the Library of Congress, George Eastman House and Academy Film Archive Beverly Hills.

References

External links
 
 

1914 films
1914 Western (genre) films
American black-and-white films
Films directed by Colin Campbell
Selig Polyscope Company films
Silent American Western (genre) films
1910s American films